The President's Athletic Conference is a college athletic conference that participates in the National Collegiate Athletic Association Division III.  Tennis is a sport played by both men and women within the conference.  The men's side consists of 7 members; five within Pennsylvania, one in West Virginia, and one in Kentucky.  The Women's side is composed of nine members; seven in Pennsylvania, one in West Virginia, and one in Kentucky.  The PAC is headquartered in Wexford, Pennsylvania.

Men

2009 Statistics in conference

2010 Statistics in conference

2011 Statistics in conference

2012 Statistics in conference

Women

2009 Statistics in conference

2010 Statistics in conference

2011 Statistics in conference

References
 http://www.pacathletics.org

Tennis